Caballeronia grimmiae is a gram-negative, non-spore-forming, rod-shaped bacterium from the genus of Caballeronia and the family of Burkholderiaceae which was isolated from the xerophilous moss Grimmia montana in China.

References

Burkholderiaceae
Bacteria described in 1998